Polemon fulvicollis, or the African snake-eater, is a species of venomous rear-fanged snake in the family Atractaspididae. It is endemic to Africa.

Geographic range
It is found in Republic of the Congo, Democratic Republic of the Congo, Gabon and Uganda.

Subspecies
Four subspecies are recognized including the nominate race.

Polemon fulvicollis fulvicollis (Mocquard, 1887)
Polemon fulvicollis gracilis (de Witte & Laurent, 1943)
Polemon fulvicollis graueri (Sternfeld, 1908)
Polemon fulvicollis laurenti (de Witte & Laurent, 1943)

References

Mocquard, F. 1887. Sur les Ophidiens rapportés du Congo par la Mission de Brazza. Bulletin de la Société philomatique de Paris (7)11:62-92. (Microsoma fulvicollis, p. 65.)
de Witte, G.F. & R.F. Laurent. 1943. Contribution à la systématique des Boiginae du Congo Belge (Rept.). Rev. Zool. Bot. Afr. 37:157-189.

Atractaspididae
Reptiles described in 1887